Hormud (also Romanized as Hormūd, Harmood, and Harmud; also known as Hormoz, Hormūd-e Bāgh, and Hormuz) is a village in Sahray-ye Bagh Rural District, Sahray-ye Bagh District, Larestan County, Fars Province, Iran. At the 2006 census, its population was 563, in 121 families.

References 

Populated places in Larestan County